Ophrys bombyliflora, the bumblebee orchid, is a species of Ophrys (bee orchid), native from the Mediterranean region from Portugal and the Canary Islands to Turkey and Lebanon. The genus name  is from the Greek in reference to the hairy lips of the flowers of this genus; the specific epithet  is from the Greek bombylios (bumblebee) in reference to the appearance of the flowers of this species.

Ophrys bombyliflora is pollinated by males of solitary bees of the genus Eucera (which are not bumblebees). As with other species of Ophrys, the flowers mimic the females in appearance and scent. Earlier-emerging males attempt to mate with the flowers ("pseudocopulation"), collecting pollinia in the process which they transfer to other flowers of the same species.

References

External links 

Tela Botanica, Ophrys bombyx
First Nature, Ophrys bombyliflora - Bumblebee Orchid
Arkive, Wildscreen, Bumble-bee orchid (Ophrys bombyliflora)
Junta de Andalucia, Ophrys bombyliflora
Orquídeas Ibéricas, Ophrys bombyliflora

bombyliflora
Flora of Europe
Flora of North Africa
Flora of Western Asia
Flora of the Canary Islands
Plants described in 1799